Ariel Goldenberg (2 February 1951 – 14 July 2021) was an Argentine-born French theatre director.

Biography
Goldenberg moved to France in 1975 and was a judge at the Festival de Nancy, directed by Jack Lang. He stayed at Chaillot until his retirement until 2008.

Ariel Goldenberg died in Nîmes on 14 July 2021 at the age of 70.

References

1951 births
2021 deaths
French theatre directors
Argentine theatre directors
Argentine emigrants to France
People from Buenos Aires